The Château de Beaucaire (Provençal: Castèu de Bèucaire) is a ruined castle in the commune of Beaucaire in the Gard département of France.

The existing structures date from the 12th and 16th centuries, with other elements from various times in the Middle Ages.

First built in the 11C, it was torn down on Richelieu's orders. It used to be protected by a wall, the trace of which can still be followed. It includes a strange polygonal tower perched on a rocky spur, the façades dominating the sheer drop, and a fine round corner tower. Once inside the walls, a staircase leads to a small Romanesque chapel with a charming, sculpted tympanum, and then to the musée Auguste Jacquet. The museum has exhibits on the region's archaeology (dating back more than 40,000 years) and popular arts and traditions.

The castle is owned by the commune and is open to the public. It has been listed since 1875 as a monument historique by the French Ministry of Culture. This intercommunality undertook work to reopen the main door of the castle in 2014. This door, which was intended for the entrance of the garrisons, now overlooks the void and today allows visitors to have a panoramic view on the landscape.

Beyond its frequentation by tourists passionate about local culture, the castle is sometimes used for filmed historical reenactments, series or films.

See also
List of castles in France

References

External links

 
 Musée Auguste Jacquet de Beaucaire web site

Castles in Gard
Monuments historiques of Occitania (administrative region)
History museums in France
Archaeological museums in France
Museums in Gard
Beaucaire, Gard